The 2016 Florida State Seminoles baseball team represented Florida State University during the 2016 NCAA Division I baseball season. The Seminoles played their home games at Mike Martin Field at Dick Howser Stadium as a member of the Atlantic Coast Conference. They were led by head coach Mike Martin, in his 37th season at Florida State. It was the Seminoles' 25th season as a member of the ACC and its 11th in the ACC's Atlantic Division.

Florida State entered the season as the defending ACC champion and finished the season as ACC runner-up.

The Seminoles reached the post-season for the thirty-ninth straight year (the second longest active streak) and were selected as the sixteenth overall seed in the NCAA Tournament, hosting for the sixth consecutive season.

Previous season

In 2015, the Seminoles finished the season with a record of 44–21, 17–13 in conference play, winning the ACC Tournament. The Seminoles qualified for the NCAA Tournament. They were hosts of the Tallahassee Regional and advanced to the Gainesville Super Regional where they were eliminated by Florida.

Preseason
In the ACC Media Poll, Florida State was picked to finish third in the Atlantic Division.

Personnel

Roster

Coaching staff

Schedule

! style="" | Regular Season 
|- valign="top" 

|- bgcolor="#bbffbb"
| Feb 19 || * || #16 || Dick Howser Stadium • Tallahassee, FL || W 19–1 || Compton (1–0) || Moyers (0–1) ||  || 4,375 || 1–0 || – 
|- bgcolor="#bbffbb"
| Feb 20 || Rhode Island* || #16 || Dick Howser Stadium • Tallahassee, FL || W 8–1 || Carlton (1–0) || Wilson (0–1) || Holton (1) || 5,580 || 2–0 || – 
|- bgcolor="#bbffbb"
| Feb 21 || Rhode Island* || #16 || Dick Howser Stadium • Tallahassee, FL || W 23–4 || Sands (1–0) || Wessel (0–1) ||  || 4,382 || 3–0 || –  
|- align="center" bgcolor="#ffbbb"
| Feb 26 || * || #11 || Dick Howser Stadium • Tallahassee, FL || L 1–2 || Helvey (1–0) || Compton (1–1) || Love (1) || 4,267 || 3–1 || –  
|- bgcolor="#bbffbb"
| Feb 27 || College of Charleston* || #11 || Dick Howser Stadium • Tallahassee, FL || W 8–3 || Carlton (2–0) || Ober (0–1) ||  || 4,751 || 4–1 || –  
|- bgcolor="#bbffbb"
| Feb 28 || College of Charleston* || #11 || Dick Howser Stadium • Tallahassee, FL || W 11–2 || Sands (2–0) || McCutcheon (1–1) ||  || 4,401 || 5–1 || –  
|-

|- align="center" bgcolor="#ffbbb"
| Mar 1 || * || #11 || Dick Howser Stadium • Tallahassee, FL || L 3–7 || Baumann (1–0) || Holton (0–1) || Cassala (1) || 3,802 || 5–2 || –  
|- bgcolor="#bbffbb"
| Mar 2 || * || #11 || Dick Howser Stadium • Tallahassee, FL || W 11–1014 || Zirzow (1–0) || Fradella (0–1) ||  || 3,659 || 6–2 || –
|- bgcolor="#bbffbb"
| Mar 4 || * || #11 || Dick Howser Stadium • Tallahassee, FL || W 16–4 || Compton  (2–1) || Christopher (0–1) ||  || 3,895 || 7–2 || – 
|- bgcolor="#bbffbb"
| Mar 5 || St. John's* || #11 || Dick Howser Stadium • Tallahassee, FL || W 9–2 || Carlton (3–0) || Nellis (0–2) ||  || 4,039 || 8–2 || –  
|- align="center" bgcolor="#ffbbb"
| Mar 6 || St. John's* || #11 || Dick Howser Stadium • Tallahassee, FL || L 1–5 || McAuliffe (1–0) || Sands (2–1) || Hackimer (2) || 4,007 || 8–3 || – 
|- bgcolor="#bbffbb"
| Mar 8 || at * || #14 || USF Baseball Stadium • Tampa, FL || W 12–4 || Haney (1–0) || Clarkson (0–1) ||  || 2,431 || 9–3 || –  
|- bgcolor="#bbffbb"
| Mar 9 || * || #14 || Dick Howser Stadium • Tallahassee, FL || W 3–2 || Voyles, J. (1–0) || Jacob (0–2) ||  || 3,147 || 10–3 || – 
|- bgcolor="#bbffbb"
| Mar 11 || #9  || #14 || Dick Howser Stadium • Tallahassee, FL || W 8–2 || Compton (3–1) || Gold (1–1) ||  || 3,792 || 11–3 || 1–0  
|- bgcolor="#bbffbb"
| Mar 12 || #9 Georgia Tech || #14 || Dick Howser Stadium • Tallahassee, FL || W 14–9 || Haney (2–0) || Dulaney (1–1) ||  || 4,068 || 12–3 || 2–0   
|- bgcolor="#bbffbb"
| Mar 13 || #9 Georgia Tech || #14 || Dick Howser Stadium • Tallahassee, FL || W 8–3 || Sands (3–1) || Hughes (3–1) ||  || 3,948 || 13–3 || 3–0 
|- align="center" bgcolor="#ffbbb"
| Mar 15 || at #1 Florida* || #9 || Alfred A. McKethan Stadium • Gainesville, FL || L 0–6 || Dunning (2–0) || Holton (0–2) ||  || 5,917 || 13–4 || –
|- bgcolor="#bbffbb"
| Mar 18 || at  || #9 || Petersen Sports Complex • Pittsburgh, PA || W 17–4 || Kinney (1–0) || Falk (2–1) || Voyles, E. (1) || 580 || 14–4 || 4–0
|- bgcolor="#bbffbb"
| Mar 19 || at Pittsburgh || #9 || Petersen Sports Complex • Pittsburgh, PA || W 10–2 || Carlton (4–0) || Sandefur (1–2) || Voyles, J. (1) || 500 || 15–4 || 5–0 
|- align="center" bgcolor="#ffbbb"
| Mar 20 || at Pittsburgh || #9 || Petersen Sports Complex • Pittsburgh, PA || L 2–5 || Zeuch (1–0) || Sands (3–2) || Mattson (1) || 208 || 15–5 || 5–1  
|- bgcolor="#bbffbb"
| Mar 22 || * || #14 || Dick Howser Stadium • Tallahassee, FL || W 7–2 || Voyles, J. (2–0) || Pimentel (0–4) ||  || 4,426 || 16–5 || –  
|- bgcolor="#bbffbb"
| Mar 23 || UCF* || #14 || Dick Howser Stadium • Tallahassee, FL || W 5–411 || Haney (3–0) || Hukari (1–2) ||  || 3,920 || 17–5 || –  
|- bgcolor="#bbffbb"
| Mar 25 || #19  || #14 || Dick Howser Stadium • Tallahassee, FL || W 8–5 || Kinney (2–0) || O'Donnell (3–2) || Warmoth (1) || 3,953 || 18–5 || 6–1  
|- bgcolor="#cccccc"
| Mar 26 || #19 NC State || #14 || Dick Howser Stadium • Tallahassee, FL || colspan=7|Cancelled
|- bgcolor="#cccccc"
| Mar 27 || #19 NC State || #14 || Dick Howser Stadium • Tallahassee, FL || colspan=7|Cancelled
|- align="center" bgcolor="#ffbbb"
| Mar 29 || vs. #1 Florida* || #8 || Baseball Grounds of Jacksonville • Jacksonville, FL || L 2–3 || Kowar (3–0) || Carlton (4–1) || Anderson (4) || 9,035 || 18–6 || –  
|-

|- bgcolor="#bbffbb"
| Apr 1 || at  || #8 || Eddie Pellagrini Diamond at John Shea Field • Chestnut Hill, MA || W 3–0 || Compton (4–1) || King (4–2) || Warmoth (2) || 314 || 19–6 || 7–1   
|- bgcolor="#cccccc"
| Apr 2 || at Boston College || #8 || Eddie Pellagrini Diamond at John Shea Field • Chestnut Hill, MA || colspan=7|Cancelled
|- bgcolor="#cccccc"
| Apr 3 || at Boston College || #8 || Eddie Pellagrini Diamond at John Shea Field • Chestnut Hill, MA || colspan=7|Cancelled
|- bgcolor="#bbffbb"
| Apr 5 || #19 Texas Tech || #5 || Dick Howser Stadium • Tallahassee, FL || W 10–1 || Voyles, J. (3–0) || Lanning (1–3) ||  || 4,002 || 20–6 || –
|- align="center" bgcolor="#ffbbb"
| Apr 6 || #19 Texas Tech || #5 || Dick Howser Stadium • Tallahassee, FL || L 4–8 || Dugger (2–0) || Sands (3–3) || Howard (3) || 3,821 || 20–7 || –
|- bgcolor="#bbffbb"
| Apr 8 || #4  || #5 || Dick Howser Stadium • Tallahassee, FL || W 12–7 || Kinney (3–0) || Sparger (0–1) ||  || 4,495 || 21–7 || 8–1 
|- align="center" bgcolor="#ffbbb"
| Apr 9 || #4 Louisville || #5 || Dick Howser Stadium • Tallahassee, FL || L 1–7 || Harrington (7–1) || Carlton (4–2) ||  || 5,539 || 21–8 || 8–2 
|- bgcolor="#bbffbb"
| Apr 10 || #4 Louisville || #5 || Dick Howser Stadium • Tallahassee, FL || W 16–5 || Voyles, J. (4–0) || Funkhouser (3–3) ||  || 4,212 || 22–8 || 9–2 
|- align="center" bgcolor="#ffbbb"
| Apr 12 || #3 Florida* || #4 || Dick Howser Stadium • Tallahassee, FL || L 2–8 || Rubio (2–0) || Voyles, E. (0–1) ||  || 5,936 || 22–9 || –
|- align="center" bgcolor="#ffbbb"
| Apr 15 || at  || #4 || Gene Hooks Field • Winston-Salem, NC || L 0–9 || Dunshee (5–3) || Compton (4–2) ||  || 1,046 || 22–10 || 9–3 
|- bgcolor="#bbffbb"
| Apr 16 || at Wake Forest || #4 || Gene Hooks Field • Winston-Salem, NC || W 13–8 || Voyles, J. (5–0) || McCarren (3–2) ||  || 1,218 || 23–10 || 10–3  
|- align="center" bgcolor="#ffbbb"
| Apr 17 || at Wake Forest || #4 || Gene Hooks Field • Winston-Salem, NC || L 2–4 || Johnstone (2–3) || Sands (3–4) || Craig (5) || 1,163 || 23–11 || 10–4  
|- bgcolor="#bbffbb"
| Apr 19 || * || #9 || Dick Howser Stadium • Tallahassee, FL || W 8–5 || Holton (1–2) || Gonzalez (3–1) || Warmoth (3) || 4,013 || 24–11 || –   
|- bgcolor="#bbffbb"
| Apr 20 || Stetson* || #9 || Dick Howser Stadium • Tallahassee, FL || W 8–6 || Karp (1–0) || Schaly (1–3) ||  || 3,822 || 25–11 || – 
|- bgcolor="#bbffbb"
| Apr 22 || #29  || #9 || Dick Howser Stadium • Tallahassee, FL || W 12–6 || Compton (5–2) || Solomon (3–4) ||  || 3,957 || 26–11 || 11–4 
|- bgcolor="#bbffbb"
| Apr 23 || #29 Notre Dame || #9 || Dick Howser Stadium • Tallahassee, FL || W 7–612 || Haney (4–0) || Vierling (2–1) ||  || 5,147 || 27–11 || 12–4  
|- bgcolor="#bbffbb"
| Apr 24 || #29 Notre Dame || #9 || Dick Howser Stadium • Tallahassee, FL || W 11–6 || Holton (2–2) || Bass (1–1) ||  || 4,278 || 28–11 || 13–4 
|- align="center" bgcolor="#ffbbb"
| Apr 30 || at Clemson || #3 || Doug Kingsmore Stadium • Clemson, SC || L 3–10 || Eubanks (3–4) || Compton (5–3) ||  || 5,304 || 28–12 || 13–5 
|-

|- bgcolor="#bbffbb"
| May 1 || at Clemson || #3 || Doug Kingsmore Stadium • Clemson, SC || W 11–2 || Carlton (5–2) || Schmidt (5–3) ||  || 4,196 || 29–12 || 14–5  
|- align="center" bgcolor="#ffbbb"
| May 2 || at Clemson || #3 || Doug Kingsmore Stadium • Clemson, SC || L 3–7 || Krall (7–1) || Holton (2–3) ||  || 3,331 || 29–13 || 14–6  
|- bgcolor="#bbffbb"
| May 6 || * || #4 || Dick Howser Stadium • Tallahassee, FL || W 6–1 || Voyles, E. (1–1) || Daugherty (4–2) ||  || 3,737 || 30–13 || –
|- bgcolor="#bbffbb"
| May 7 || Bowling Green* || #4 || Dick Howser Stadium • Tallahassee, FL || W 10–0 || Carlton (6–2) || Carey (3–8) ||  || 4,179 || 31–13 || –
|- bgcolor="#bbffbb"
| May 8 || Bowling Green* || #4 || Dick Howser Stadium • Tallahassee, FL || W 6–1 || Sands (4–4) || Lacinak (2–7) ||  || 3,733 || 32–13 || –
|- align="center" bgcolor="#ffbbb"
| May 10 || at Jacksonville* || #4 || John Sessions Stadium • Jacksonville, FL || L 2–6 || Tanner (3–0) || Karp (1–1) ||  || 337 || 32–14 || –
|- align="center" bgcolor="#ffbbb"
| May 11 || * || #4 || Dick Howser Stadium • Tallahassee, FL || L 8–11 || Knoblauch (5–0) || Warmoth (0–1) ||  ||  || 32–15 || –
|- align="center" bgcolor="#ffbbb"
| May 13 || at  || #4 || Jack Coombs Field • Durham, NC || L 4–5 || Urbon (7–1) || Carlton (6–3) || Stallings (8) || 617 || 32–16 || 14–7 
|- align="center" bgcolor="#ffbbb"
| May 14 || at Duke || #4 || Jack Coombs Field • Durham, NC || L 1–3 || Swart (3–2) || Sands (4–5) ||  || 814 || 32–17 || 14–8
|- bgcolor="#bbffbb"
| May 15 || at Duke || #4 || Jack Coombs Field • Durham, NC || W 4–3 || Voyles, J. (6–0) || McAfee (7–4) || Warmoth (4) || 727 || 33–17 || 15–8 
|- bgcolor="#cccccc"
| May 17 || at Stetson* || #8 || Melching Field at Conrad Park • DeLand, FL || colspan=7|Cancelled
|- align="center" bgcolor="#ffbbb"
| May 19 || #2 Miami (FL) || #8 || Dick Howser Stadium • Tallahassee, FL || L 2–4 || Meyer (1–0) || Voyles, J. (6–1) || Garcia (13) || 4,156 || 33–18 || 15–9
|- align="center" bgcolor="#ffbbb"
| May 21 || #2 Miami (FL) || #8 || Dick Howser Stadium • Tallahassee, FL || L 5–8 || Mediavilla (10–1) || Sands (4–6) || Garcia (14) || 5,024 || 33–19 || 15–10 
|- bgcolor="#bbffbb"
| May 21 || #2 Miami (FL) || #8 || Dick Howser Stadium • Tallahassee, FL || W 3–210 || Warmoth (1–1) || Guerra (1–1) ||  || 5,024 || 34–19 || 16–10  
|-

|-
! style="" | Post-Season 
|- 

|- bgcolor="#bbffbb"
| May 25 || vs. #13 (5) NC State || #11 (4) || Durham Bulls Athletic Park • Durham, NC || W 7–3 || Haney (5–0) || Gilbert (3–1) ||  || 3,409 || 35–19 || 1–0 
|- bgcolor="#bbffbb"
| May 26 || vs. (9) Georgia Tech || #11 (4) || Durham Bulls Athletic Park • Durham, NC || W 6–1 || Sands (5–6) || Ryan (3–3) ||  || 2,504 || 36–19 || 2–0
|- bgcolor="#bbffbb"
| May 28 || vs. #2 (1) Miami (FL) || #11 (4) || Durham Bulls Athletic Park • Durham, NC || W 5–4 || Byrd (1–0) || Meyer (1–1) ||  || 4,754 || 37–19 || 3–0
|- align="center" bgcolor="#ffbbb"
| May 29 || vs. #28 (6) Clemson || #11 (4) || Durham Bulls Athletic Park • Durham, NC(Championship) || L 13–18  || Bostic (4–2) || Voyles, E. (1–2) ||  || 4,863 || 37–20 || 3–1
|-

|- bgcolor="#bbffbb"
| Jun 3 || (4)  || #12 (1) || Dick Howser Stadium • Tallahassee, FL(Tallahassee Regional) || W 18–6 || Carlton (7–3) || Camacho (10–1)  ||  || 3,276 || 38–20 || 1–0
|- bgcolor="#bbffbb"
| Jun 4 || #24 (2)  || #12 (1) || Dick Howser Stadium • Tallahassee, FL(Tallahassee Regional) || W 7–2 || Holton (3–3) || Cockrell (7–2) || Voyles, J. (2) || 3,496 || 39–20 || 2–0
|- bgcolor="#bbffbb"
| Jun 5 || (3)  || #12 (1) || Dick Howser Stadium • Tallahassee, FL(Tallahassee Regional Final) || W 18–6 || Sands (6–6) || Soleymani (4–4) ||  || 2,592 || 40–20 || 3–0
|- bgcolor="#bbffbb"
| Jun 11 || #2 (1) Florida || #9 (16) || Alfred A. McKethan Stadium • Gainesville, FL(Gainesville Super Regional) || W 3–0 || Carlton (8–3) || Faedo (13–2) ||  || 5,768 || 41–20 || 4–0
|- align="center" bgcolor="#ffbbb" 
| Jun 12 || #2 (1) Florida || #9 (16) || Alfred A. McKethan Stadium • Gainesville, FL(Gainesville Super Regional) || L 0–5 || Shore (12–0) || Holton (3–4)  ||  || 5,326 || 41–21 || 4–1
|- align="center" bgcolor="#ffbbb" 
| Jun 13 || #2 (1) Florida || #9 (16) || Alfred A. McKethan Stadium • Gainesville, FL(Gainesville Super Regional Final) || L 0–7 || Dunning (6–3) || Sands (6–7) ||  || 4,475 || 41–22 || 4–2
|-

|-
| style="font-size:88%" | Legend:       = Win       = Loss       = PostponementBold = Florida State team member
|-
| style="font-size:88%" | Rankings from Collegiate Baseball; parenthesis indicate tournament seedings.

Rankings

Awards

Watchlists
 NCBWA Stopper of the Year Award
Matthew Kinney 
Tyler Warmoth
 National Pitcher of the Year Award
Jim Voyles
 Brooks Wallace Award
Taylor Walls

Finalists
 Dick Howser Trophy
John Sansone
Taylor Walls

Honors
Regional MVP
Dylan Busby
ACC Player of the Week
John Sansone
Quincy Nieporte
National Player of the Week
Quincy Nieporte
All-ACC
First Team
John Sansone
Second Team
Taylor Walls
Freshman Team
Cal Raleigh
All-Americans
Louisville Slugger
Third Team
John Sansone
Freshman Team
Cal Raleigh
Baseball America
First Team
Taylor Walls
Freshman Team
Tyler Holton
Cal Raleigh
National Collegiate Baseball Writers Association
Third Team
Taylor Walls
First Team (Freshman)
Cal Raleigh
D1 Baseball
Third Team
Taylor Walls
Perfect Game
Honorable Mention
Taylor Walls
First Team (Freshman)
Cal Raleigh

All-Star games
Taylor Walls and Cole Sands were named to the USA Baseball Collegiate National Team.

MLB Draft
One player was selected in the 2016 MLB Draft.

References

External links
 Media Guide

Florida State Seminoles
Florida State Seminoles baseball seasons
Florida State